Neocollyris rectangulivertex is a species of ground beetle in the genus Neocollyris in the family Carabidae. It was described by Horn in 1929.

References

Rectangulivertex, Neocollyris
Beetles described in 1929